Cai Emmons ( – January 2, 2023) was an American author. Emmons died on January 2, 2023, at the age of 71 years old. Her cause of death was ruled ALS.

Books
His Mother’s Son
The Stylist
Weather Woman
Sinking Islands
Unleashed
Livid
Vanishing

References 

1950s births
Year of birth missing
2023 deaths
American writers
Deaths from motor neuron disease